Dinjčić, sometime Dinjičić, later branch known as Kovačević, were Bosnian medieval noble family which flourished during kingdom period, and ruled the Jadar-Drinjača areal and wider Srebrenica .

Coat of Arms 
The family coat of arms is described in every iteration of the Illyrian Armorials, such as Fojnica Armorial at page 59. It depict a dragon motif above the helmet, in the crest. It also belongs to the Kovačević branch, which is evident from the comments.

References

Bibliography 
 
 
 

Bosnian magnates
Medieval Bosnian nobility
Dinjčić noble family